Udayakantha Warnasuriya is a Sri Lankan film director, producer, screenwriter and author. Considered to be one of Sri Lanka's best film makers, Warnasuriya has made many movies, including Gini Avi Saha Gini Keli, Rosa Wasanthe, Hiripoda Wassa, Randiya Dahara and Asai Man Piyabanna.

By 2018, Warnasuriya had directed 25 films, produced 7 films, wrote 5 film stories, 9 film scripts, 2 film dialogues and 3 film screenplays.

Filmography

Films

Teledramas
 Sagaraya Parada
 Diyasuliya
 Eka Gei Kurullo
 Menik Ketayama
 Senehase Geethaya

Controversy
In 2017, Warnasuriya was arrested for allegedly making a film to duplicate the performances of veteran film actor Bandu Samarasinghe. The actor made a complaint against Warnasuriya and similar actor Bindu Bothalegama. On a previous occasion, Warnasuriya and four others were summoned. They were released on a surety bail of Rs.10,000.

Author
Warnasuriya has written two books, based on his popular films.

Yakada Pihatu
Wassanaye Sanda

References

External links
Udayakantha Warnasuriya Biography in Sinhala Cinema Database
 

Two New Movies By Udayakantha Warnasuriya
dgosl
Show to the gallery
Udayakantha Warnasuriya Film Festival in Italy
Udayakantha conquers the sky

Living people
Sri Lankan film directors
Sinhalese people
Year of birth missing (living people)